Brendan M. Glynn (6 January 1910 – 10 July 1986) was an Irish Fine Gael politician and solicitor who served as a Teachta Dála (TD), representing the Galway South constituency in Dáil Éireann. He was educated at Garbally College, County Galway. Glynn served one term following the 1954 general election, having previously unsuccessfully contested the Galway South by-election in August 1953. He did not stand at the 1957 general election.

References

1910 births
1986 deaths
Fine Gael TDs
Members of the 15th Dáil
Irish solicitors
Politicians from County Galway
20th-century Irish lawyers
People educated at Garbally College